Gérard Chaliand (born 1934) is a French expert in geopolitics who has published widely on irregular warfare and military strategy. Chaliand analyses of insurgencies in Asia, Africa, Latin America, and the Middle East, mostly based on his field experience with insurgent forces, have appeared in more than 20 books and in numerous newspaper articles.  He has worked autonomously throughout his career, unconstrained by the perspectives of national governments and policy institutes. As a result, his work provides an independent perspective on many of the major conflicts characterized the 20th and 21st centuries.  He is also a published poet.

Early life and education
Born in Brussels to Armenian parents and raised in Paris, Chaliand attended the Lycée Henri IV in the Latin Quarter and spent nearly a year in London and the United Kingdom. He travelled North Africa before entering the School of Oriental Languages and Civilisations (INALCO) in Paris, where his studies focused on the history and culture of non-western societies. During his youth he hitchhiked across North Africa, Turkey, Iran, Pakistan and India. He published his first book of poetry (La Marche Têtue, Gallimard) in 1959. In 1960 he joined the clandestine struggle for Algerian Independence. After the Algerian independence, he worked during 1963-64 as an editor at the Revolution Africaine, a weekly in Algiers where he met many of the leaders of the national liberation movements of Asia, Africa, Latin America, and the Middle East.

He received his PhD from Sorbonne University in Paris in 1975. His dissertation Mythes révolutionnaires du tiers monde, was published in 1976 and quickly translated into English: Revolution in the Third World, Myths and Propects, Viking Press, Penguin Books, New York, 1977.

Chaliand has been a participant-observer in various guerrilla conflicts:
 Guinea Bissau, 1966
 North Vietnam, 1967
 Colombia, 1968/91
 Palestine/Israel, 1969/70/75/ 98/99
 Eritrea, 1977/91
 Afghanistan, 1980/82/2006-2012
 Iranian Kurdistan, 1980
 Salvador, 1982
 Angola, 1985
 Peru, 1985
 Philippines, 1987
 Nagorno-Karabakh, 1993
 Georgia (Ossetia), 1994/2006/08
 Burma, 1990/95
 Kashmir, 1999
 Sri Lanka, 1987/99/2007
 Iraqi Kurdistan, 1999-2008/2012-2015
 Iraq, 2003-2008
 Syria, 2014
He has conducted field studies for over four decades in:
 Asia/Pacific 
 Caucasus and Central Asia
 Central and South America
 Middle East
 Northern Africa
 Russia
 South and South East Asia
 West, East and Southern Africa

Teaching 
He taught in Paris, France, at the École nationale d'administration (1980-1987) and at Ecole de Guerre (War College) from 1990 to 1995.

Chaliand has spent more than five years as a visiting professor in the United States at Harvard, U.C.L.A. and U.C. Berkeley.

He delivered over five hundred lectures in major Universities and research centers, including the Rand Corporation and the US Naval Postgraduate School, Monterey, California. (1969-2009).

He was also a visiting professor at the military academy, Bogota (Colombia), and Universities of Cape Town (South Africa), Montreal (Canada), Salamanca (Spain), Sussex and Manchester (United Kingdom), Vladikavkaz (Northern Ossetia), Sulaymaniyah (Iraq), and Ilia Chavchavadze (Georgia). He was senior visiting fellow at the centre for Conflicts and Peace Studies, Kabul (Afghanistan) from 2005 to 2011. He taught a summer course at Nanyang University (Singapore) from 2004 to 2014 and Hawler University (Erbil, Iraqi Kurdistan, since 2012).

He has also lectured at Strategic Institutes in Washington D.C., London, Canberra, Beijing, Madrid, and Tokyo.

Miscellaneous 
He was Director of the European Centre for the Studies of Conflicts (Foundation for Strategic Research), Paris from 1997 to 2000.

He was an independent adviser to the Centre for Analysis and Planning of the French Foreign Ministry from 1983 to 1994.

He founded and was the Director of Minority Rights Group (France), from 1978 to 1987.

He was the initiator of the cession of the Permanent People’s Tribunal that was dedicated to the genocide of the Armenian people whose jury comprised three Nobel Prize winners, including Mr. Sean Mc Bride, Founder of Amnesty International, and which took place at Sorbonne and saw the sentence towards the Turkish state delivered to the National Assembly.

In addition, Chaliand has undertaken several maritime expeditions aboard La Boudeuse, a three mast.

Selected bibliography 
Chaliand is the author, the co-author or the editor of more than 50 books, over 20 of which have been translated into English.

Books in English 
 A World History of War, UC Press Berkeley, 2014. 
 History of Terrorism: From Antiquity to al Qaïda (with Arnaud Blin), Berkeley, 2007.
 Mirrors of a Disaster. The Spanish conquest of America, Transaction, Rutgers University Press. N.J. 2005
 Nomadic Empires, From Mongolia to the Danube, Transaction, Rutgers University Press, N.J. 2003. 
 The Penguin Atlas of Diasporas, New York, 1995.
 The Art of War in World History, Berkeley, 1994.
 The Kurdish Tragedy, Zed Press, London, 1994, Report to the sub-commission on Human Rights (UN) on the situation of the Kurds in the Middle East.
 Strategic Atlas: A Comparative Geopolitics of the World's Powers, with J.P. Rageau, Harper & Row, New York 1987, 1990, updated edition 1992.
 Minorities at the Age of Nation-States (ed) Pluto Press, London, 1988.
 Terrorism, Saqi Books, London: 1987.
 The Genocide of the Armenians, Zoryan Institute, Boston, Mass, 1986
 Guerrilla Strategy. A Historical Anthology From the Long March to Afghanistan, ed. Berkeley, 1982.
 The Struggle for Africa. Great Power Strategies, Macmillan, London 1982.
 Report from Afghanistan, Penguin Books, Baltimore, 1982. 
 A People without a country, The Kurds and Kurdistan, (Ed), Zed Books 1980, Olive Branch Press, 1993 
 Revolution in the Third World: Myths and Prospects, Viking, New York 1977; updated edition, Penguin Books, 1989. 
 The Palestinian Resistance, Penguin Books, Baltimore 1972.
 Peasants of North Vietnam, Penguin Books, Baltimore 1970. 
 Armed Struggle in Africa: With the guerrillas in Portuguese Guinea, Monthly Review Press, New York 1969.

Chaliand has also written a cookbook, Food without Frontiers, Pluto Press, London 1981 and two books of poems The Stubborn March, Crane Books, Watercrown, MA. 1990, and Lone Rider, bilingual edition, translated by André Demir, Paris, 2015.

Many of his books have been translated in more than twelve languages.

Books in French

Political Analysis 
 L'Algérie est-elle socialiste?, Maspéro, 1964
 Où va l’Afrique du Sud ?, Calmann-Lévy, 1986
 Etat de crise, vers les nouveaux équilibres mondiaux (avec J. Minces), Seuil, 1993 
 Voyage dans le demi-siècle (avec Jean Lacouture), Complexe, 2001
 America is back, les nouveaux Césars du Pentagone, (avec Arnaud Blin), Bayard, 2003
 L'Amérique en guerre, Irak-Afghanistan, Editions du Rocher, 2007 
 L'Impasse afghane, Éditions de l’Aube, 2011
 Vers un nouvel ordre du monde (avec Michel Jan), Le Seuil, 2013
 De l’Esprit d’aventure (avec P. Franceschi et J.C. Guilbert, J’ai lu, Arthaud,J’ai lu, 2011
 Le Regard du singe (avec Patrice Franceschi) Seuil 2014

Military strategy 
 Atlas du nucléaire civil et militaire (avec Michel Jan), Payot, 1993
 Dictionnaire de stratégie militaire (avec Arnaud Blin), Perrin, 1998
 Les Guerres irrégulières, Folio Gallimard, 2008
 Le Nouvel Art de la guerre, l'Archipel, 2007, Pocket 2009

Geopolitical and Historical Atlases 
 Atlas de la découverte du monde (avec J-P. Rageau), Fayard, 1984 
 Atlas politique du XXème siècle (avec J-P. Rageau), Seuil, 1987
 Atlas des Européens (avec J-P. Rageau), Fayard, 1989
 Atlas des empires. De Baylone à la Russie Soviétique (avec JP Rageau), Payot, 1993
 Atlas historique des migrations (avec M. Jan et J-P. Rageau), Seuil, 1994
 Atlas historique du monde méditerranéen (avec J-P. Rageau) Payot, 1995
 Atlas de l’Asie orientale (avec M. Jan et J-P. Rageau), Seuil, 1997
 Atlas du millénaire, la mort des empires, 1900-2015 (avec J-P. Rageau), Hachette, 1998
 Atlas du nouvel ordre mondial, Laffont, 2003
 Géopolitique des empires, des pharaons à l'Imperium américain, (avec J-P. Rageau) Arthaud, 2010, Flammarion 2014

History 
 Les Bâtisseurs d'histoire, Arléa, 1995, Edition augmentée, Agora 2005, Magellan, 2012
 2000 ans de chrétientés,  (avec S. Mousset), Odile Jacob, 2000,  2003
 L'Héritage occidental, (avec S. Mousset), Odile Jacob, 2002,2015

Memoirs 
 Mémoire de ma mémoire, Julliard, 2003
 Guérillas, du Vietnam à l’Irak, Hachette Pluriel, 2008
 La Pointe du couteau. Mémoires, Robert Laffont, 2011

Travel 
 Los Angeles, Naissance d’un Mythe,  Stock, 1991.
 Aux confins de l’Eldorado, Le Seuil, 2006
 Le Guide du voyageur autour du monde (avec S. Mousset) Odile Jacob, 2007

Gerard Chaliand has also published three plays, four books for children and translations of Kautiliya’s Arthashastra (book seven), Guevara's La guerra de Guerillas, and a book of popular Turkish poetry (bilingual).

References

External links

New York Review of Books 
Gérard Chaliand : « En Irak, l'insurrection armée montre sa terrible efficacité face à la meilleure armée du monde », April 2006 interview concerning the Iraqi insurgency 
Gérard Chaliand : Terrorismes et contre-terrorismes ; de la Palestine à l'Irak, June 25, 2003 conference of L'Université de tous les savoirs, published in Le Monde (audio files available)
Groupes mafieux et globalisation du crime  (video), conference of the Université de tous les savoirs
Gérard Chaliand : «Les troupes américaines devront rester en Irak», June 9, 2006 interview in Le Figaro
Le destin shakespearien de Saddam Hussein, dictateur sanguinaire et ambigu, par Gérard Chaliand, op-ed in Le Figaro, January 1, 2007
Report before the French Senate, March 22, 2002
Belgian parliamentary study day on terrorism

1934 births
French poets
University of Paris alumni
Guerrilla warfare theorists
French military writers
Living people
French male poets
French people of Armenian descent
French male non-fiction writers
Belgian emigrants to France
French expatriates in the United Kingdom